British Phonographic Industry (BPI) is the British recorded music industry's Trade association. It runs the BRIT Awards, the Classic BRIT Awards, National Album Day, is home to the Mercury Prize, and co-owns the Official Charts Company with the Entertainment Retailers Association, and awards UK music sales through the BRIT Certified Awards.

Structure
Its membership comprises hundreds of music companies including all three "major" record companies in the UK (Warner Music UK, Sony Music UK, & Universal Music UK), and over 450 independent record labels and small to medium-sized music businesses.

The BPI council is the management and policy forum of the BPI. It is chaired by the chair of BPI, and includes the chief executive, chief operating officer (COO) and the general counsel. In addition it includes 12 representatives from the recorded music sector, six from major labels, two each from the three major companies, and six from the independent sector, which are selected by voting of all BPI independent label members. As of 2021, the council members were:
 YolanDa Brown (chair, from July 2022), Geoff Taylor (chief executive), M.J. Olaore (COO), Kiaron Whitehead (general counsel)
 Major labels:  Jason Iley and Jessica Carsen (Sony), David Joseph and Selina Webb (Universal), Tony Harlow and Jo Bartlett (Warner)
 Independent labels: Alice Dyson (One Media IP), Fred Jude (Snapper Music), Henry Semmence (Absolute Label Services), Nick Hartley (PIAS Group), Pat Carr (Remote Control Agency), Stefania Passamonte (Master Chord Records)

History
It has represented the interests of British record companies since being formally incorporated in 1973 when the principal aim was to promote British music and fight copyright infringement.

In 2007, the association's legal name was changed from "British Phonographic Industry Limited (The)" to "BPI (British Recorded Music Industry) Limited".

In September 2008, the BPI became one of the founding members of UK Music, an umbrella organisation representing the interests of all parts of the industry.

In July 2022, YolanDa Brown was appointed chair of BPI, replacing Ged Doherty who served in that role the previous seven years.

Awards
It founded the annual Brit Awards for the British music industry in 1977, and, later, The Classic BRIT Awards. The organising company, BRIT Awards Limited, is a fully owned subsidiary of the BPI. Proceeds from both shows go to the BRIT Trust, the charitable arm of the BPI that has donated over £26m to charitable causes nationwide since its foundation in 1989. In September 2013, the BPI presented the first ever BRITs Icon Award to Sir Elton John. The BPI also endorsed the launch of the Mercury Prize for the Album of the Year in 1992, and since 2016 has organised the Prize.

The recorded music industry's Certified Awards program, which attributes Platinum, Gold and Silver status to singles, albums and music videos (Platinum and Gold only) based on their sales performance (see BRIT Certified Awards), has been administered by the BPI since its inception in 1973.

The BRIT Trust
The BRIT Trust is the charitable arm of the BPI, the trust was conceived in 1989 by a collection of leading music industry individuals with a mission to give young people a chance to express their musical creativity regardless of race, class, sex or ability. The BRIT Trust is the only music charity actively supporting all types of education across the entire spectrum of music. Through the projects it supports, which include Nordoff–Robbins music therapy & the BRIT School, the Trust offers young people the opportunity to enhance their lives through music. Proceeds from the BRIT Awards and the Classic BRITs shows go to the BRIT Trust, which has donated over £26m to charitable causes nationwide since its foundation.

The BRIT School
Opened in September 1991, the BRIT School is a joint venture between The BRIT Trust and the Department for Education and Skills (DfES). Based at Selhurst in Croydon, the comprehensive school describes itself as the only non-fee-paying performing arts school in the UK. It teaches up to 1,100 students each year aged from 14 to 19 years in music, dance, drama, musical theatre, production, media and art & design. Students are from diverse backgrounds and are not required to stick to their own discipline; dancers learn songwriting, pianists can learn photography.

Certifications

The BPI administers the BRIT Certified Platinum, Gold and Silver awards scheme for music releases in the United Kingdom. The level of the award varies depending on the format of the release (albums, singles or music videos) and the level of sales achieved. Although the awards program was for many years based on the level of shipments by record labels to retailers, since July 2013 certifications have been automatically allocated by the BPI upon the relevant sales thresholds being achieved in accordance with Official Charts Company data.

Since July 2014, streaming media has been included for singles and from June 2015 audio streams were added to album certifications. In July 2018 video streams were included in singles certifications for the first time. Streaming's contributions to chart-eligible sales totals for singles and albums are calculated using the methodology employed by the Official Charts Company for consumption at title level.

In April 2018, a new Breakthrough certification was introduced, pertaining to an artist's first album to reach 30,000 sales. Additionally, the program was re-branded as BRIT Certified, with public promotion of the programme being assumed by the BRIT Awards' social media outlets and digital properties. Chief executive Geoff Taylor justified the change by stating that it was part of an effort to cross-promote the certifications with "the UK's biggest platform for artistic achievement".

Anti-piracy operations
The BPI have developed bespoke software and automated crawling tools created in-house by the BPI which search for members repertoire across more than 400 known infringing sites and generate URLs which are sent to Google as a DMCA Notice for removal within hours of receipt. Additionally, personnel are also seconded to the City of London Police Intellectual Property Crime Unit to support anti-"piracy" operations.

See also
Home Taping Is Killing Music
Official Charts Company
List of music recording certifications

Notes

References

External links
 

Music organisations based in the United Kingdom
Organizations established in 1973
Media and communications in the London Borough of Lambeth
1973 establishments in the United Kingdom
Organisations based in the London Borough of Lambeth